The 2005 NCAA Division I-A football season was the highest level of college football competition in the United States organized by the National Collegiate Athletic Association (NCAA). The regular season began on September 1, 2005 and ended on December 3, 2005. The postseason concluded on January 4, 2006 with the Rose Bowl, which served as the season's BCS National Championship Game.

The USC Trojans and the Texas Longhorns finished the regular season as the only undefeated teams in Division I-A and consequently met in the Rose Bowl to play for the national title. Texas defeated USC largely due to the performance of quarterback Vince Young, who gained 467 yards of total offense and ran for three touchdowns. The Longhorns won their first national championship since 1970, and their first consensus national title since 1969.

Rule changes
 Seven additional conferences would join the Big Ten in adopting instant replay systems.
 Removed "intentional" from the rule regarding spearing.
 Leaping will not be called on a defensive player lined up within one yard of the line of scrimmage, unless he lands on other players.
 Eliminating the "legal clipping zone" to make clipping illegal anywhere on the field.
 To ensure more consistent enforcement, a list of acts considered "unsportsmanlike conduct" is added, including the "throat slash", high stepping and diving into the end zone unchallenged among others.  Spontaneous celebrations by players are allowed provided they are not prolonged, taunting, or bring attention to themselves.

Conference changes

A major conference realignment occurred prior to the 2005 season, when 18 teams in Division I-A changed conferences.

Temple was expelled from the Big East Conference while Army ended its brief affiliation with Conference USA, resulting in both schools becoming Independents.

Boston College left the Big East to become the 12th member of the Atlantic Coast Conference (ACC), allowing the league to split into two divisions and hold an annual championship game.

Cincinnati, Louisville and South Florida left Conference USA to join the Big East. Texas Christian University also left Conference USA to become the Mountain West Conference's ninth member.

Despite its losses, Conference USA added six schools to increase its membership to twelve, poaching Marshall and UCF from the Mid-American Conference and Rice, Southern Methodist, Tulsa, and UTEP from the Western Athletic Conference (WAC). Like the ACC, Conference USA split into two divisions and started a conference championship game.

The Western Athletic Conference added Idaho, New Mexico State and Utah State from the Sun Belt Conference.

The Sun Belt picked up I-AA Independents Florida Atlantic and Florida International.

Coaching changes

Steve Spurrier returned to college coaching for the first time since 2001 after a stint in the NFL, leading South Carolina to a respectable 7–5 season. Urban Meyer, after leading Utah to an undefeated season in 2004, took over at Florida (Spurrier's old school). Charlie Weis left the New England Patriots to become head coach at alma mater Notre Dame, taking the team to a BCS bowl.

Longtime head coaches Barry Alvarez of Wisconsin and Bill Snyder of Kansas State, both of whom took struggling programs to national prominence during their tenures, retired. Dan Hawkins, having helped make Boise State a powerhouse in the Western Athletic Conference, left the Broncos to coach struggling Colorado.

Regular season top 10 matchups
Rankings reflect the AP Poll. Rankings for Week 8 and beyond will list BCS Rankings first and AP Poll second. Teams that failed to be a top 10 team for one poll or the other will be noted.
Week 2
No. 2 Texas defeated No. 4 Ohio State, 25–22 (Ohio Stadium, Columbus, Ohio)
Week 3
No. 6 Florida defeated No. 5 Tennessee, 16–7 (Ben Hill Griffin Stadium, Gainesville, Florida)
Week 4
No. 10 Tennessee defeated No. 4 LSU, 30–27 OT (Tiger Stadium, Baton Rouge, Louisiana)
Week 6
No. 5 Georgia defeated No. 8 Tennessee, 27–14 (Neyland Stadium, Knoxville, Tennessee)
Week 7
No. 1 USC defeated No. 9 Notre Dame, 34–31 (Notre Dame Stadium, South Bend, Indiana)
Week 8
No. 2/2 Texas defeated No. 7/10 Texas Tech, 52–17 (Darrell K Royal–Texas Memorial Stadium, Austin, Texas)
Week 10
No. 6/5 Miami defeated No. 3/3 Virginia Tech, 27–7 (Lane Stadium, Blacksburg, Virginia)
Week 11
No. 7/5 LSU defeated No. 3/4 Alabama, 16–13 OT (Bryant-Denny Stadium, Tuscaloosa, Alabama)

Conference standings

Bowl games

BCS bowls

Rose Bowl: No. 2 (BCS No. 2, Big 12 Champ) Texas 41, No. 1 (BCS No. 1, Pac 10 Champ) Southern California 38
Fiesta Bowl: (BCS No. 4) No. 4 Ohio State 34, (At Large) No. 5 Notre Dame 20
Sugar Bowl: (Big East Champ) No. 11 West Virginia 38, (SEC Champ) No. 8 Georgia 35
Orange Bowl: (Big Ten Champ) No. 3 Penn State  26, (ACC Champ) No. 25 Florida State 23 (3 OT)

Other New Year's Day bowls
Cotton Bowl: No. 13 Alabama 13, No. 18 Texas Tech 10
Capital One Bowl: No. 21 Wisconsin 24, No. 7 Auburn 10
Gator Bowl: No. 12 Virginia Tech 35, No. 15 Louisville 24
Outback Bowl: No. 16 Florida 31, No. 25 Iowa 24

December bowl games
Peach Bowl: No. 10 LSU 40, No. 9 Miami (FL) 3
Houston Bowl: No. 14 TCU 27, Iowa State 24
Liberty Bowl: (C-USA Champ) Tulsa 31, Fresno State 24
MPC Computers Bowl: No. 19 Boston College 27, Boise State 21
Meineke Car Care Bowl: NC State 14, South Florida 0
Independence Bowl: Missouri 38, South Carolina 31
Sun Bowl: No. 17 UCLA 50, Northwestern 38
Music City Bowl: Virginia 34, Minnesota 31
Holiday Bowl: Oklahoma 17, No. 6 Oregon 14
Emerald Bowl: Utah 38, No. 24 Georgia Tech 10
Alamo Bowl: Nebraska 32, No. 20 Michigan 28
Insight Bowl: Arizona State 45, Rutgers 40
Champs Sports Bowl: No. 23 Clemson 19, Colorado 10
Motor City Bowl: Memphis 38, (MAC Champ) Akron 31
Hawai'i Bowl: (WAC Champ) Nevada 49, UCF 48 (OT)
Fort Worth Bowl: Kansas 42, Houston 13
Las Vegas Bowl: California 35, BYU 28
Poinsettia Bowl: Navy 51, Colorado State 30
GMAC Bowl: Toledo 45, UTEP 13
New Orleans Bowl: Southern Mississippi 31, (Sun Belt Champ) Arkansas State 19

Awards and honors

Heisman Trophy
Heisman Trophy voting was primarily for three players: Reggie Bush, Matt Leinart (who won the trophy in 2004) and Vince Young. Bush won the trophy, with Young (who helped Texas win their first national championship since 1970) second in the voting:

 Reggie Bush, Jr. USC TB (2,541 points)
 Vince Young, Jr. Texas QB (1,608)
 Matt Leinart, Sr. USC QB (797)
 Brady Quinn Jr. Notre Dame QB (191)
 Michael Robinson, Sr. Penn State QB (49)

In June 2010 the NCAA ruled that Bush had received "improper benefits", violating NCAA policy. On September 14, he announced in a statement from the New Orleans Saints that he would forfeit his 2005 Heisman Trophy. Runner-up Vince Young said that he would not accept the trophy if Bush forfeited it. On September 15, the Heisman Trust announced that the 2005 trophy would be vacated and there would be no winner for the season.

Major award winners
Walter Camp Award (top player): Reggie Bush
Maxwell Award (top player): Vince Young, QB, Texas
AP Player Of the Year: Reggie Bush, RB, USC
Lombardi Award (top lineman/linebacker): A. J. Hawk, Ohio State
John Mackey Award (tight end): Marcedes Lewis, UCLA
Doak Walker Award (running back)
Chuck Bednarik Award (defensive player): Paul Posluszny, LB, Penn State
Outland Trophy (interior lineman): Greg Eslinger, C, Minnesota
Dave Rimington Trophy (center): Greg Eslinger, Minnesota
Davey O'Brien Award (quarterback): Vince Young, QB, Texas
Johnny Unitas Award (senior quarterback): Matt Leinart, USC
Fred Biletnikoff Award (wide receiver): Mike Hass, Oregon State
Jim Thorpe Award (defensive back): Michael Huff, Texas
Lou Groza Award (placekicker): Alexis Serna, Oregon State
Ray Guy Award (punter): Ryan Plackemeier, Wake Forest
The Home Depot Coach of the Year Award: Joe Paterno, Penn State
Paul "Bear" Bryant Award (head coach): Mack Brown, Texas
Broyles Award (assistant coach): Greg Davis, Texas

All-Americans

2005 Consensus All-America team

Highest-scoring team
Texas scored the most points (652).

References